Lakhan Sahadeo Malik is a member of Maharashtra Legislative Assembly. He represents the Washim Assembly Constituency. He belongs to the Bharatiya Janata Party.

References

Maharashtra MLAs 2014–2019
People from Washim
Marathi politicians
Bharatiya Janata Party politicians from Maharashtra
Living people
1964 births
Maharashtra MLAs 2019–2024